Society Hill is a historic neighborhood of Philadelphia.

Society Hill may also refer to:

 "Society Hill" (Body of Proof), an episode of Body of Proof
 Society Hill, Middlesex County, New Jersey, an unincorporated community
 Society Hill, South Carolina, a town in Darlington County
Society Hill Historic District (Portage, Wisconsin)
 Society Hill, a housing development in Droyer's Point, Jersey City, New Jersey

See also
Society Hill Towers
Society Hill Synagogue